The 1970–71 Romanian Hockey League season was the 41st season of the Romanian Hockey League. Six teams participated in the league, and Dinamo Bucuresti won the championship.

Regular season

External links 
hochei.net

Rom
Romanian Hockey League seasons
Rom